Maine School Administrative District 1 (MSAD 1) is an operating school district within Maine, covering the towns of Castle Hill, Chapman, Mapleton, Presque Isle and Westfield. 

The district is headquartered in Presque Isle. The elementary schools are Pine Street and Zippel in Presque Isle and Mapleton in Mapleton. Presque Isle Middle School is the district middle school and Presque Isle High School is the district high school.

References

External links
 

01
01
Presque Isle, Maine